Josh Smith (born August 30, 1982 in Dallas, Texas) is an American soccer midfielder, currently without a club. He was the 2003 NCAA Division III Player of the Year.

College
Smith attended Trinity University, playing on the men’s NCAA Division III soccer team from 2000 to 2003.  He was a 2001 third team and a 2002 and 2003 first team Division III All American.  He was also selected as the 2003 NSCAA Division III Player of the Year as Trinity won the Division III National Championship.

Professional
In 2004, he turned professional with the Charleston Battery of the USL First Division.  After two seasons in Charleston, he moved to the Atlanta Silverbacks for the 2006 season.  Smith lost the 2007 season after tearing his anterior cruciate ligament.  In 2008, he joined the Wilmington Hammerheads of the USL Second Division.

References

External links
 Charleston Battery Player Profile
 Wilmington Hammerheads Player Profile

1982 births
Living people
American soccer players
Atlanta Silverbacks players
Charleston Battery players
USL First Division players
USL Second Division players
Wilmington Hammerheads FC players
Soccer players from Texas
Association football midfielders